Rick Leach and Jim Pugh were the defending champions.

Scott Davis and Tim Wilkison won the title, defeating Leach and Pugh 6–4, 7–6 in the final.

Seeds

  Jorge Lozano /  Todd Witsken (first round)
  Rick Leach /  Jim Pugh (final)
  Kevin Curren /  David Pate (semifinals)
  Jim Grabb /  Patrick McEnroe (semifinals)

Draw

Draw

External links
 Main draw

Doubles